Gospel Church may refer to:
 Gospel Church, Chengdu
 Gospel Church, Guanghan
 Gospel Church, Jiangyou
 Gospel Church, Kangding
 Gospel Church, Langzhong
 Gospel Church, Mianyang
 Gospel Church, Mianzhu
 Gospel Church, Wanzhou
 Gospel Church, Zhenjiang